Bhaag Khesari Bhaag is a 2019 Indian Bhojpuri language sports drama film directed by Premanshu Singh and produced by Umashankar Prasad with co-produced by Ayush Raj Gupta under banner of "J P Stars Pictures". Its star Khesari Lal Yadav and Smriti Sinha in lead roles. While Ayaz Khan, Amit Shukla, Sanjay Verma, Amit Choudhary, Satya Prakash, Pritam Kumar, Rahul Sahu and others in supporting roles. The story was written by Manoj Kushwaha.

Cast
Khesari Lal Yadav
Smriti Sinha
Ayaz Khan
Amit Shukla
Sanjay Verma
Amit Choudhary
Satya Prakash
Pritam Kumar
Rahul Sahu

Production
The film is directed by Premanshu Singh and produced by Umashankar Prasad with co-produced by Ayush Raj Gupta and written by Manoj K Kushwaha. The cinematography has been done by Sarfaraj Rashid Khan while choreography is by Rikki Gupta and Ram Devan. Jitendra Singh (Jeetu) is the editor. Dress designing by Bhojpuri's famous dio Kavita-Sunita.

Release
The film was theatrically released on 1 November 2019 on occasion of Chhath Pooja across all theatres of Bihar and Jharkhand.

Music

Music of "Bhag Khesari Bhag" is composed by Om Jha with lyrics penned by Pyare Lal Yadav, Azad Singh, Shyam Dehati, Prakash Barood, Yadav Raj and Pawan Pandey. It is produced under the "Enter10 Music Bhojpuri" Music compony.

His song "Biscuit Dubake" released on 27 October 2019, was crossed over 20 million views on YouTube.

References

2010s Bhojpuri-language films
2019 films